HMS Richmond was the name ship of the six-vessel, 32-gun Richmond-class fifth-rate frigates of the Royal Navy. She was launched in 1757 and served throughout the American Revolutionary War. She captured a prize in Chesapeake Bay in January, 1778 and 1 off Cape Charles in February, 1778. She was captured by the French 74-gun Bourgogne and the frigate Aigrette captured her on 11 September 1781 in the Chesapeake. She then served as Richemont under Lieutenant Mortemart.

On 12 April 1782 she fought at the Battle of the Saintes and famously tried to tow Glorieux to safety. A painting of the attempt was made later, and was on display at the Ministry of the Navy in the 1930.

Fate
The French burned her at Sardinia on 19 May 1793 to prevent the Spanish from capturing her.

Citations and references 
Citations

References
 
 
 Robert Gardiner, The First Frigates, Conway Maritime Press, London 1992. .
 
 David Lyon, The Sailing Navy List, Conway Maritime Press, London 1993. .
  (1671–1870)

Winfield, Rif & Stephen S Roberts (2015) French Warships in the Age of Sail 1786 – 1861: Design Construction, Careers and Fates. (Seaforth Publishing). 

https://www.fedex.com/fedextrack/?trknbr=285904157143&trkqual=12022~285904157143~FDEG

Fifth-rate frigates of the Royal Navy
1757 ships
Ships built in Deptford
Captured ships
Frigates of the French Navy